The 1999–00 Icelandic Hockey League season was the ninth season of the Icelandic Hockey League, the top level of ice hockey in Iceland. Three teams participated in the league, and Skautafelag Reykjavikur won the championship.

Regular season

Final 
 Skautafélag Reykjavíkur - Skautafélag Akureyrar 3:2 (5:6, 3:2, 5:2, 3:6, 5:4)

External links 
 1999-00 season

Icelandic Hockey League
Icelandic Hockey League seasons
1999–2000 in Icelandic ice hockey